Peter Paul Wojey (December 1, 1919 – April 23, 1990) was an American professional baseball pitcher whose career extended for 15 seasons over a 20-year span. It included 18 games pitched over parts of three years in Major League Baseball for the Brooklyn Dodgers and Detroit Tigers (–).

Wojey began his pro career at age 21 in 1941 in the Class D Florida East Coast League. Then, after five years (1942–1946) out of baseball, he returned to the professional game. He was acquired by the Dodger organization in 1948 and spent 6 years at the Double-A level, 4 of them with the Mobile Bears of the Southern Association. 

When he was recalled from Mobile by Brooklyn in July 1954, he made his first MLB appearance on July 2 at 34 years, 213 days old. His debut would be his only starting pitcher assignment in the majors. Facing the Philadelphia Phillies at Connie Mack Stadium, he hurled four hitless innings, allowing only an unearned run. By the bottom of the fifth inning, the Dodgers had built a 4–1 lead, but Wojey ran into trouble, surrendering four hits and three runs and recording only one out. The Phillies would win the game, 7–6, with relief pitcher Clem Labine tagged with the loss.

Wojey would work in 17 more MLB games, all in relief, for the Dodgers and Tigers. He earned his only big-league victory on August 2, 1954, against the Milwaukee Braves by throwing a scoreless 13th inning (stranding Hank Aaron on third base after Aaron led off the Braves' half with a triple), and his only save 27 days later, preserving a 12–4 triumph for Labine, also against the Braves.

Wojey's two brief stints with the Tigers took place in the early weeks of the 1956 and 1957 seasons, at a time when MLB teams could carry three extra players on their rosters for each campaign's first 30 days. 

Overall, Wojey posted a 1–1 won–lost record and one save, all as a member of the Dodgers, with a career earned run average of 3.00. In 33 innings pitched, he gave up 27 hits and 15 bases on balls, recording 22 strikeouts. He continued his minor league baseball career through 1960, working in 444 games in the minors.  He died in Mobile, Alabama, at the age of 70.

References

External links

1919 births
1990 deaths
American people of Polish descent
Baseball players from Pennsylvania
Brooklyn Dodgers players
Charleston Senators players
Detroit Tigers players
Fort Worth Cats players
Hot Springs Bathers players
Little Rock Travelers players
Major League Baseball pitchers
Miami Wahoos players
Mobile Bears players
Montreal Royals players
Olean Oilers players
People from Montgomery County, Pennsylvania
St. Paul Saints (AA) players
San Diego Padres (minor league) players
Toronto Maple Leafs (International League) players
Waterloo White Hawks players